The Scarlet Lady is a 1928 American silent drama film, written by Bess Meredyth and directed by Alan Crosland. It was produced and distributed by Columbia Pictures.

Plot 
During the Russian Civil War, Lya seeks refuge from Cossack soldiers at the palace of Prince Nicholas. She becomes his majordomo and they fall in love, but Nicholas expels her after learning she is a revolutionary and the former mistress of the Bolshevik leader Zaneriff. After returning to her home village, Lya becomes a terrorist. She reencounters Nicholas in disguise as a servant after the Red Army captures his palace. After he is discovered and sentenced to death, she rescues him and they escape together.

Cast
Lya De Putti as Lya
Don Alvarado as Prince Nicholas
Warner Oland as Zaneriff
Otto Matieson as The Valet	
Hans Joby as Captain 
Valentina Zimina as Revolutionary

Preservation
A print is held at Cineteca Nazionale, Rome. It was previously thought to be lost.

References

External links

lobby poster

1928 films
American silent feature films
American black-and-white films
1928 drama films
Films directed by Alan Crosland
Silent American drama films
Columbia Pictures films
1920s rediscovered films
Rediscovered American films
Russian Civil War films
Films about terrorism in Europe
1920s American films